Faridpur is a village in the Punjab province of Pakistan.

References

External links
 News of Narowal, Sahkargarh, Zafarwal and other towns, villages. www.barapind.co.cc
Bara Pind's official web site : www.barapind.co.cc

Narowal District